Dennis Malcolm Coates (born 11 February 1953) is a male retired British middle-distance runner. Coates competed in the men's 3000 metres steeplechase at the 1976 Summer Olympics. He represented England in the 3,000 metres steeplechase event, at the 1978 Commonwealth Games in Edmonton, Alberta, Canada.

References

1953 births
Living people
Athletes (track and field) at the 1976 Summer Olympics
Athletes (track and field) at the 1978 Commonwealth Games
British male middle-distance runners
British male steeplechase runners
Olympic athletes of Great Britain
Sportspeople from Sunderland
Commonwealth Games competitors for England